All Night Session! Vol. 3 is an album by pianist Hampton Hawes from a session recorded the morning of November 13, 1956 at Contemporary's Studios in Los Angeles and released on the Contemporary label.

Reception

The Allmusic review states "Vol. 3 of the Hampton Hawes Quartet's All Night Session contains three spontaneously improvised variations on the blues, one very cool extended rendition of Duke Ellington's 'Do Nothin' 'Till You Hear from Me' and a strikingly handsome treatment of Harold Arlen's 'Between the Devil and the Deep Blue Sea.

Track listing

Personnel
Hampton Hawes – piano
Jim Hall – guitar
Red Mitchell – bass 
Eldridge Freeman – drums

References

Contemporary Records albums
Hampton Hawes albums
1958 albums